The black-eared flying fox, species Pteropus melanotus, is a bat of the family Pteropodidae (megabats). Also known as Blyth's flying fox, it is found on the Andaman Islands and Nicobar Islands (India), and in Sumatra (Indonesia). A population on Christmas Island, which is critically endangered, has been placed as a subspecies of this population. The conservation and taxonomic status of that population was later re-established as a distinct species, the Christmas Island fruit-bat Pteropus natalis.

Distribution and habitat
The black-eared flying fox is native to various island groups in the Indo-Pacific. These include the Andaman Islands, the Nicobar Islands, the Mentawai Islands. It mostly roosts in large colonies in forests near the coast, especially in mangrove areas.

Biology
The black-eared flying fox is more diurnal than most bats, emerging from its roosts before dusk and feeding on the fruits and flowers of at least twenty-six species of forest trees at least ten of which are introduced species. A single young is born annually.

Status
The black-eared flying fox faces a number of threats. Destruction of its forest habitat reduces the availability of roosting sites and the animal is hunted by man for food. The crushed bones of this species are used in traditional medicine to relieve asthma symptoms. However, it has proved adaptable to changes in diet and now feeds on a number of introduced species of plant. The IUCN has rated this species as "Vulnerable".

References

External links 

Pteropus
Bats of South Asia
Bats of Southeast Asia
Bats of India
Bats of Indonesia
Fauna of the Andaman and Nicobar Islands
Vulnerable fauna of Asia
Mammals described in 1863
Taxa named by Edward Blyth
Taxonomy articles created by Polbot